The Piranha Unmanned Surface Vessel (USV or unmanned surface vehicle) is a watercraft developed by Zyvex Marine (a division of Zyvex Technologies, formerly Zyvex Performance Materials) in 2010. The boat is 54 feet in length and weighs just 8,000 lbs. The Piranha is the first USV to utilize a lightweight carbon-nanotube enhanced composite material called Arovex, which allows the watercraft to weigh "significantly less" than any other USV.

The weight advantage from Arovex gives the Piranha a payload capacity of 15,000 lbs and a range of over 2,500 miles. Additionally, the carbon nanotubes provide a strength increase of 20–50% over traditional materials. With those characteristics, the Piranha is expected to be sold as a possible tool for anti-piracy, search and rescue, submarine hunting, and harbor patrol.

The first Piranha began construction in February 2010 with an anticipated completion date of summer 2010. The Piranha underwent sea trials near Seattle's Puget Sound during the months of October and November 2010. 

The Piranha concluded approximately 6 months and 600 nautical miles of sea trials in Washington state and Oregon state on April 4, 2011.

References

External links
Zyvex Performance Materials
Piranha USV

Unmanned surface vehicles of USA
Vehicles introduced in 2010